Tuber gibbosum is a species of truffle in the genus Tuber. It is found in the Pacific Northwest region of the United States, where it grows in an ectomycorrhizal association with Douglas-fir. It is commercially collected between as early as October and into March.

Taxonomy and phylogeny

The species was first described by American mycologist Harvey Wilson Harkness in 1899. The specific epithet derives from the Latin word gibbosum meaning "humped", and refers to the irregular lobes and humps on larger specimens. T. gibbosum is part of the gibbosum clade of the genus Tuber. Species in this clade have unusual "peculiar wall thickenings on hyphal tips emerging from the peridial surface at maturity."

T. gibbosum resembles the similar species T. oregonense, and both are found growing under Douglas fir.

Edibility
Tuber gibbosum is edible and can be prepared similarly to European truffles; it is typically used to add flavor to a dish.

References

External links
 

gibbosum
Truffles (fungi)
Fungi of North America
Fungi described in 1899